The Knowledge is the fifteenth studio album, and the fourteenth album of original material, by British rock band Squeeze, released on 13 October 2017. It is the first and only Squeeze album to feature Yolanda Charles on bass after the departure of bassist Lucy Shaw.

Critical reception
Stephen Thomas Erlewine of AllMusic rated The Knowledge positively; in a four out of five-star review, he proclaimed the record "a masterly latter-day work".

Track listing

Personnel
Squeeze
 Glenn Tilbrook – vocals, guitar, keyboards
 Chris Difford – vocals; guitar on 1
 Yolanda Charles – bass
 Stephen Large – keyboards
 Simon Hanson – drums
 Steve Smith – percussion; backing vocal on 8

with:
 Seamus Beaghen – additional keyboards on 1, 2, 3, 4, 7, 9, 11, 12
 Melvin Duffy – pedal steel guitar on 1, 2, 7, 8, 9, 11, 12
 Dennis Greaves – guitar on 11
 Paul Jordanous – trumpet on 3
 Frank Mead – saxophone on 3, 5, 11
 Chris Rand – saxophone on 3
 Matt Winch – flugelhorn/trumpet on 3, 5, 11
 Cara McHardy – operatic vocals on 5
 Billie Godfrey, Bryan Chambers, Louise Marshall, Simon King – backing vocals on 2, 3, 5, 7

Musicians on track 10:
 Glenn Tilbrook – vocals, guitar, finger cymbals, handclaps
 Chris Difford – vocals
 Ted Tilbrook – bass
 Andrew Jones – bongos, handclaps
 Louis Tilbrook – celesta
 Chris McNally – harmonium

Charts

References

Squeeze (band) albums
2017 albums
Albums produced by Glenn Tilbrook
Albums produced by Laurie Latham